Toycular yarcan is a form of the Anatolian folk dance kochari (Halay). Toycular yarcan is a folk dance spread all over  Turkey and Azerbaijan.

External links

See also 
Halay
Kochari

Turkish dances
Azerbaijani dances